A' Chill was a village on Canna, in the Scottish Small Isles. The name means "the cell", referring to a Culdee church, and is often anglicised as "Kil-" in many other Scottish names. Located in the west of Canna, it was the main settlement until 1851 when the island was cleared. There are now only one or two houses near the original site.

References

External links 
A' Chill at the Gazetteer for Scotland

Populated places in Lochaber
Canna, Scotland